Nigel Hart (born 1 October 1958) is an English former football defender who played for Wigan Athletic, Leicester City, Blackpool, Crewe Alexandra, Bury, Stockport County, Chesterfield and York City.

Career
Hart started his career on a part-time basis at Stockport County before joining Wigan Athletic in 1978. After spending a season in the reserve team, he made one Football League appearance for the club during the 1979–80 season before moving to Leicester City.

Personal life
Hart is the son of Johnny Hart, who played for and managed Manchester City. His brother, Paul, also played as a defender.

References

External links
 Career statistics

1958 births
Living people
English footballers
Association football defenders
Wigan Athletic F.C. players
English Football League players
Leicester City F.C. players
Blackpool F.C. players
Crewe Alexandra F.C. players
Bury F.C. players
Stockport County F.C. players
Chesterfield F.C. players
York City F.C. players